Kukowo may refer to the following places:
Kukowo, Kuyavian-Pomeranian Voivodeship (north-central Poland)
Kukowo, Podlaskie Voivodeship (north-east Poland)
Kukowo, Pomeranian Voivodeship (north Poland)
Kukowo, Warmian-Masurian Voivodeship (north Poland)